The Vice Versa Tour was the third concert tour by Puerto Rican singer Rauw Alejandro, in support of his second studio album, Vice Versa (2021). It began on January 15, 2022 in Los Angeles and concluded on June 11 of that year in Barcelona, with several shows throughout United States, Latin America, and Spain. DVILA, Joonti, and Pailita served as supporting acts on the tour.

Background
On January 12, 2022, Rauw Alejandro formally announced the Vice Versa tour, with 25 shows across the United States, Latin America, and Spain from January 15 to June 11 of that same year. Tickets went on sale on the same day. On February 2, 2022, Alejandro announced a new Latin American date in Guayaquil, Ecuador. On February 16, 2022, he announced that he had been forced to postpone the dates in Movistar Arena in Santiago, Chile and Jockey Club del Perú in Lima, Peru to May 5 and 6, 2022, respectively, due to the COVID-19 pandemic restrictions in the countries; tickets purchased for the original shows were fully valid for the new dates, however there was a process of requesting the return of the money between February 16 and March 13. The April shows on the North American leg, which included seven dates, were retitled to the Rauw Arena Tour, with Puerto Rican singers DVILA and Joonti being announced as the opening acts of the tour. The tour is produced by Elite & Media Marketing (EMM). On April 27, 2022, Chilean singer Pailita was confirmed to be the opening act of the Movistar Arena show in Santiago.

Critical reception

The Vice Versa Tour was met with highly positive reviews from critics. Writing for Latina, Lucas Villa called Alejandro an "incredible showman" and stated that he proves he is "the next big Latin pop star" on the tour. He added that "dancing is an integral part to the way Alejandro presents himself" in his performances. An author of Diario El Norte gave the Buenos Aires show a positive review, saying he "confirmed his excellent professional moment by shining in the concert he gave" at the Estadio Luna Park. Erwin Perez from El Nuevo Herald praised his performance at the FTX Arena, labeling it "a complete party". He continued: "Rauw doesn't give the public a break, he has a mastery of the stage and a sense of showmanship that avoids bumps." Sónica.mx critic Emily Paulin named his show in Monterrey one of "8 concerts and festivals in Monterrey that you cannot miss in 2022".

Accolades
The Vice Versa Tour was nominated for Concert/Tour of the Year at the 2022 Premios Tu Música Urbano, but lost to the Bichota Tour by Karol G.

Set list
This set list is representative of the show on June 10, 2022 in Málaga. It is not representative of all concerts for the duration of the tour.

"Dile a Él"
"Mírame"
"El Efecto"
"Caprichoso"
"Enchule"
"Nubes"
"Fantasías"
"Pensándote"
"Problemón"
"Nostálgico"
"Tattoo"
"Perreo Pesau'"
"Loco por Perrearte (Remix)"
"La Old Skul"
"Cosa Guapa"
"Wuepa"
"Desenfocao'"
"Algo Mágico"
"Tiroteo (Remix)"
"Museo"
"Aquel Nap ZzZz"
"Cúrame"
"Dream Girl (Remix)"
"2/Catorce"
"Sexo Virtual"
"Reloj"
"Party"
"Desesperados"
"Todo de Ti"
"La Nota"

Special guests

Alejandro surprised fans throughout the tour with special guests, performing his collaborations with them.
 February 18, 2022 – Buenos Aires: Cazzu, María Becerra, and Nicki Nicole
 April 9, 2022 – Miami: Anuel AA, De La Ghetto, and Nio García
 April 29, 2022 – Panama City: Sech

Shows

Footnotes

References

2022 concert tours
Concert tours of Europe
Concert tours of Mexico
Concert tours of North America
Concert tours of South America
Concert tours of Spain
Concert tours of the United States
Concert tours postponed due to the COVID-19 pandemic
Rauw Alejandro